The Grand Army of the Republic Memorial Hall was constructed as a memorial to American Civil War soldiers in Peoria, Illinois, United States in 1909.  It was designed by Hewitt & Emerson.  The Classical Revival hall was dedicated to Joseph B. Greenhut, Captain of Company K, 82nd Illinois Volunteer Infantry Regiment. The building was added to the National Register of Historic Places on July 13, 1976, and was listed as an example of Beaux-Arts architecture.

Notes

External links
History of the hall

National Register of Historic Places in Peoria County, Illinois
Illinois
Buildings and structures in Peoria, Illinois
Military monuments and memorials in the United States
Clubhouses on the National Register of Historic Places in Illinois
1909 establishments in Illinois
Buildings and structures completed in 1909
Illinois in the American Civil War